Auzout is a lunar impact crater that is located to the southeast of the Mare Crisium, near the eastern limb of the Moon. It is named after French astronomer Adrien Auzout. Attached to the southern rim is the smaller crater van Albada. To the east-northeast is the large Condorcet. This crater is not especially notable, although it does possess a central mountain. This crater is designated 'Azout' in some sources.

Satellite craters

By convention these features are identified on lunar maps by placing the letter on the side of the crater midpoint that is closest to Auzout. 

The following craters have been renamed by the IAU.
 Auzout A — See van Albada (crater).
 Auzout B — See Krogh (crater).

References

External links
 
 LTO-62B4 Auzout — L&PI topographic map

Impact craters on the Moon